U.S. Route 20 (US 20) in Indiana is a main east–west highway that is parallel to the Indiana Toll Road. The western terminus of US 20 is at the Illinois state line and the eastern terminus is at the Ohio state line. US 20 through Whiting, East Chicago, and Gary is concurrent with US 12 twice.  The route varies between one-way, two-lane, and four-lane streets, in northwestern Indiana. From the east side of Gary to west of South Bend, US 20 is a four-lane undivided highway. The route then heads around the west and south sides of South Bend and Elkhart as a four-lane limited access divided highway.  East of State Road 15 (IN-15), US 20 is two-lane rural highway.

US 20 was part of the Dunes Highway from the Illinois state line to Michigan City, concurrent with US 12. The Dunes Highway started being paved in 1922.  The section of the highway that is known as Lincoln Way was part of the 1913 section of the Lincoln Highway.  Indiana State Highway Commission, later renamed Indiana Department of Transportation, began signing US 20 in 1926.  US 20 went through downtown South Bend and Elkhart before the St. Joseph Valley Parkway was built.  Before the parkway was completed, the route that was open to traffic was called Bypass US 20.  A small realignment in LaGrange County was done in 2005, in which the roadway was straightened.  Other small realignments included the route through Michigan City, which followed US 35 from US 12 to I-94.

Route description
Only the segment of US 20 that is concurrent with the St. Joseph Valley Parkway is included as a part of the National Highway System (NHS).  The NHS is a network of highways that are identified as being most important for the economy, mobility and defense of the nation.  The highway is maintained by the Indiana Department of Transportation (INDOT) like all other U.S. Routes in the state. The department tracks the traffic volumes along all state highways as a part of its maintenance responsibilities using a metric called average annual daily traffic (AADT). This measurement is a calculation of the traffic level along a segment of roadway for any average day of the year. In 2010, INDOT figured that lowest traffic levels were the 3,390 vehicles and 1,090 commercial vehicles used the highway daily near the Ohio state line. The peak traffic volumes were 36,040 vehicles and 731 commercial vehicles AADT along the section of US 20 concurrent with SR 331.

Illinois to South Bend 
US 20 enters Indiana concurrent with US 12 and US 41, at which point it passes under the Indiana Toll Road.  The road passes by both commercial and industrial areas, between Wolf Lake and Horseshoe Casino.  US 12, US 20, and US 41 are concurrent until US 41 turns south on Calumet Avenue.  US 12 and US 20 head southeast toward East Chicago; in East Chicago, US 12 turns east and US 20 continues south.  US 20 meets State Road 312 (SR 312) and passes under the Indiana Toll Road.  US 20 turns left onto Michigan Street and heads east to Gary passing both industrial and residential areas.  On the way to Gary, US 20 has an interchange with SR 912; at the interchange, the road name changes to 5th Avenue. Just west of Gary, US 12 and US 20 have a concurrency.

US 12 and US 20 are concurrent through most of Gary.  From Bridge Street to Vermont Street, the eastbound traffic of US 12/US 20 is on 5th Avenue and westbound traffic is on 4th Avenue.  East of downtown Gary, the eastbound and westbound lanes merge to form the Dunes Highway.  Before reaching the neighborhoods of northeastern Gary, the Dunes Highway has an interchange with Interstate 65 (I-65) and I-90/Indiana Toll Road.

Shortly thereafter, US 12 leaves to the northeast toward Michigan City and US 20 heads east then northeast, forming a major retail corridor through the neighborhoods of Aetna and Miller Beach.  US 20 then meets SR 51 at the state road's northern terminus, near the boundary between Lake Station and Gary.  Just west of Portage, the road passes under I-94.  In Portage, the route has intersections with both SR 249 and SR 149.  The road now enters Burns Harbor and has interchanges with I-94 and SR 49, just south of the Indiana Dunes.  The route heads northeast until Town of Pines, where it intersects with SR 520.  After Pines, the route heads due east to US 421 in Michigan City.

From US 421, the route heads east and then northeast around Michigan City. On the east side of Michigan City the route has an interchange with both SR 212 and I-94 followed by an intersection with the northern terminus of US 35.  After US 35, the route becomes a four-lane undivided highway until Rolling Prairie, passing SR 39 at Springville.  East of Rolling Prairie the route meets SR 2.  US 20 heads northeast and then east and SR 2 heads due east.  The route passes through Hudson Lake and New Carlisle before South Bend.

South Bend to Ohio 
On the west side of South Bend, near the city's airport, US 20 meets and exits onto the St. Joseph Valley Parkway which then runs due south along with US 31. At this cloverleaf interchange the continuing road to the east is Lincolnway West, the original routing of US  20 into the city, which has been modified from its original alignment to skirt the south end of an extended runway at the airport. Now concurrent with US 31, the  St. Joseph Valley Parkway has another cloverleaf junction, with SR 2 on Western Avenue, before it curves to the southeast to run along the southwest side of South Bend.  The freeway then turns due east before encountering yet another cloverleaf interchange, this one with departing US 31 and Michigan Street, just south of downtown South Bend.  Further east, on the south side of Mishawaka, US 20 has a  concurrency with SR 331.  The road has a partial cloverleaf interchange with US 33 near Dunlap.  The interchange with Old US 20 is incomplete with no access to westbound Old US 20 from eastbound US 20.  Soon after the junction with Old US 20 is an interchange with Elkhart County Road 17.  The County Road 17 interchange marks the eastern terminus of the limited-access freeway known as the St. Joseph Valley Parkway.

US 20 heads east from Elkhart towards Middlebury, as a four-lane roadway with a center turn lane. The road has an intersection with SR 15 south of Bristol. After the intersection with SR 15, US 20 becomes a two-lane highway.  The route passes through the southwest side of Middlebury.  On the south side of Middlebury the route has a traffic light at SR 13.  The route becomes a four-lane divided highway just west of this intersection, and soon after the intersection the road becomes a two-lane highway.  From Middlebury, the route heads east towards LaGrange, passing through rural farmland in eastern Elkhart County and western LaGrange County.  On the way to LaGrange the route passes through an intersection with SR 5 just south of Shipshewana.  The route heads east towards downtown LaGrange, having an intersection with SR 9.  The route heads east through rural farmland in eastern LaGrange County and western Steuben County.  The route enters Angola and has an interchange with I-69.  The road continues east into downtown Angola, passing just to the north of Trine University.  At the center of downtown, US 20 has a roundabout with SR 127 (Old US 27).  After going through the east side of Angola, the route continues east towards Ohio.  In rural eastern Steuben County, the route passes through farmland and has an intersection with the northern terminus of SR 1.  Just west of the Ohio state line the route passes under the Indiana Toll Road (I-80/I-90).

History 

An important road from 1900 to 1910 was the Old Chicago Road, later renamed the Dunes Highway. The Dunes Highway Association engineers envisioned the Dunes Highway a "state of the art"  concrete highway with a  right-of-way. Narrower than anticipated, the new concrete highway was still superior to most Indiana roads, which in the mid-1920s were gravel or dirt with paved sections only between the larger towns. Dunes Highway construction began in 1922 under the guidance of Gary contractor Ingwald Moe and construction engineer Ezra Sensibar.

US 20 was part of the first alignment of the Lincoln Highway in 1913 from the current SR 2 in Rolling Prairie to Elkhart, where the Lincoln Highway turned southeast on to current US 33.  In 1926, the Lincoln highway was rerouted to US 30.

Between 1917 and 1926 the route from Illinois state Line to Michigan City was SR 43; this route was named Dunes Highway. At this time,  US 20 from Michigan City to Ohio state line was SR 25.  When US 20 was signed in Indiana, in 1926, the section from Illinois state line to Michigan City was concurrent with US 12 and the Dunes Highway.  In the early 1930s US 20 from the Illinois state line to Michigan City was moved to its current route.  In the mid-1970s Bypass US 20 (BYP US 20) went from US 31 to US 20, on the southwest side of South Bend.  Until 1998, US 20 went through downtown Elkhart and South Bend. When the State of Indiana built the St. Joseph Valley Parkway, the route downtown was decommissioned.

In 2005 a series of sharp curves around Rainbow Lake were removed; the curves were located six miles west of Lagrange.  A new straight roadway was built, from just east of SR 5 to just east of Lagrange County Road 600 West.

Future 
The Indiana Department of Transportation plans to make US 20 a four-lane highway with a center turn lane from just east of SR 15 to SR 13.  The project will be done in a two different phases. Phase one will be from SR 15 to Elkhart County Road 35, and phase two will be from CR 35 to SR 13.  The final phase is scheduled for completion around 2020.

Major intersections

See also

Indiana State Road 120

References

External links

 Indiana
20
Transportation in Gary, Indiana
Transportation in South Bend, Indiana
Northwest Indiana
Transportation in Elkhart, Indiana
Transportation in Lake County, Indiana
Transportation in Porter County, Indiana
Transportation in LaPorte County, Indiana
Transportation in St. Joseph County, Indiana
Transportation in Elkhart County, Indiana
Transportation in LaGrange County, Indiana
Transportation in Steuben County, Indiana